Hypsopygia taiwanalis is a species of snout moth in the genus Hypsopygia. It was described by Shibuya in 1928. It is found in Taiwan.

References

Moths described in 1928
Pyralini